In the mathematical area of graph theory, a conference graph is a strongly regular graph with parameters v,   and   It is the graph associated with a symmetric conference matrix, and consequently its order v must be 1 (modulo 4) and a sum of two squares.

Conference graphs are known to exist for all small values of v allowed by the restrictions, e.g., v = 5, 9, 13, 17, 25, 29, and (the Paley graphs) for all prime powers congruent to 1 (modulo 4).  However, there are many values of v that are allowed, for which the existence of a conference graph is unknown.

The eigenvalues of a conference graph need not be integers, unlike those of other strongly regular graphs.  If the graph is connected, the eigenvalues are k with multiplicity 1, and two other eigenvalues, 
 
each with multiplicity

References

Brouwer, A.E., Cohen, A.M., and Neumaier, A. (1989), Distance Regular Graphs.  Berlin, New York: Springer-Verlag.  , 

Algebraic graph theory
Graph families
Strongly regular graphs